Marcos Rivadero (born 9 October 1992) is an Argentine professional footballer who plays as a midfielder for Defensores de Belgrano.

Career
Rivadero played part of his youth with Villa Azalais, prior to joining Belgrano in 2003. Ten years later, Rivadero was an unused substitute for a 2012–13 Primera División match against Unión Santa Fe. In May 2014, he made his professional debut in a 0–0 draw at home to Arsenal de Sarandí in 2013–14. In 2014, Rivadero made five further appearances for Belgrano. On 4 February 2015, Rivadero joined Guillermo Brown on loan. He subsequently made twenty-two league appearances. He also scored his first career goal, in the final match of 2015 in the relegation play-off against Gimnasia y Esgrima.

In 2016, Rivadero joined Universidad San Martín of the Peruvian Primera División on loan. He went onto score one goal in seventeen matches, with his only goal coming in his penultimate appearance versus Alianza Atlético on 27 May. He then rejoined Guillermo Brown for a second loan spell. Forty-one matches and two goals followed for Rivadero as the club finished third in Primera B Nacional, missing promotion by two points. He returned to Belgrano in August 2017. In January 2018, Rivadero joined Villa Dálmine of Primera B Nacional on loan. He scored three goals in ten appearances.

Primera B Nacional side Gimnasia y Esgrima loaned Rivadero on 16 July 2018. Despite joining for twelve months, his loan was terminated in December after featuring just three times.

Career statistics
.

References

External links

1992 births
Living people
Footballers from Córdoba, Argentina
Argentine footballers
Association football midfielders
Argentine expatriate footballers
Expatriate footballers in Peru
Argentine expatriate sportspeople in Peru
Argentine Primera División players
Primera Nacional players
Peruvian Primera División players
Club Atlético Belgrano footballers
Guillermo Brown footballers
Club Deportivo Universidad de San Martín de Porres players
Villa Dálmine footballers
Gimnasia y Esgrima de Mendoza footballers
Club Atlético Mitre footballers
Defensores de Belgrano footballers